Amity Hill is a populated place in Chambersburg Township, Iredell County, North Carolina, United States. The Wayside Volunteer Fire Department is located in the Amity Hill community.

History

A post office was established at Amity Hill on July 5, 1851. The post office name was changed to Amity on May 2, 1892, and it was discontinued November 15, 1906.

References

Unincorporated communities in Iredell County, North Carolina
Unincorporated communities in North Carolina